The Chortomlyk Sich (also Old Sich) is a Zaporozhian Sich  state founded by the Cossacks led by kish otaman Fedir Lutay in the summer of 1652 on the right bank of the Chortomlyk distributary of the Dnieper near modern village of Kapulivka.

The Sich lasted until May 25, 1709, when it was destroyed by the Moscow punitive expedition undertaken in response to a support of Hetman Ivan Mazepa by the Zaporozhian Cossacks.

History 
During the Khmelnytsky Uprising, Chortomlyk Sich guarded the then southern borders of Ukraine. Cossacks of the Sich took part in the Bohdan Khmelnytskyi's campaigns, excelling in the battles of Zhvanets (1653), Horodok (1655), during the second siege of Lviv (1655), etc.

The national recognition of the Chortomlyk Sich spread during the time of kish otaman Ivan Sirko (1659—1680), who lived exclusively in the Chortomlyk Sich for 17 years and was elected a kish otaman more than 15 times, favoring his military merits. In particular, he became famous for the defeat of the 60,000-strong Ottoman-Tatar army, which suddenly attacked Chortomlyk Sich on New Year's Eve in 1675; as well as the Crimean campaign of 1676, when the Cossacks led by Sirko for the first time forced controlled by Crimean tatars Syvash bay and defeated the Khan's capital Bakhchisarai.

After the defeat of Ivan Mazepa and his supporters at the Battle of Poltava in 1709, the Chortomlyk Sich was destroyed by the Moscow armed forces together with the capital of Cossack Hetmanate, Baturyn and other Ukrainian cities.

References 

Zaporozhian Cossacks
Zaporozhian Sich historic sites
Zaporozhian Host
History of the Cossacks in Ukraine
Early Modern history of Ukraine